Viehmann is a surname. It is the surname of:
Dorothea Viehmann (1755–1816), German storyteller
Eva Viehmann, German mathematician
Franz Viehmann, German actor in Interrogating the Witnesses and Rising to the Bait
George E. Viehmann, Jr., American newscaster for KABR (defunct)